Pursuit of Radical Rhapsody is an album by Italian-American jazz fusion and Latin jazz guitarist Al Di Meola, released in 2011.

Track listing
All compositions by Al Di Meola except where noted.

 "Siberiana"  – 8:30 			
 "Paramour's Lullaby"  – 7:47
 "Mawazine, Pt. 1" – 2:09 			
 "Michelangelo's 7th Child" – 7:33 			
 "Gumbiero" – 6:19 			
 "Brave New World" – 1:54 			
 "Full Frontal Contrapuntal" – 4:53 			
 "That Way Before" – 3:06 			
 "Fireflies" – 4:02 			
 "Destination Gonzalo" – 5:17 			
 "Bona" – 6:02 			
 "Radical Rhapsody" – 5:03 			
 "Strawberry Fields" (John Lennon, Paul McCartney) – 4:11 			
 "Mawazine, Pt. 2" – 2:55
 "Over the Rainbow" (Harold Arlen) – 3:06

Personnel
World Sinfonia
 Al Di Meola – acoustic guitar, electric guitar, keyboards, percussion, producer
 Fausto Beccalossi – accordion
 Péter Kaszás – drums, percussion
 Victor Miranda – acoustic upright baby bass
 Gumbi Ortiz – percussion
 Kevin Seddiki – second guitar

Guests and other musicians
 Mino Cinélu – percussion (3, 4, 13, 14)
 Peter Erskine – drums (4, 10, 12)
 Charlie Haden – acoustic bass (13, 15)
 Gonzalo Rubalcaba – piano (5, 10, 12, 13)
 Barry Miles – additional keyboards, string arrangements
 String section:
 Gyula Benkö – viola (4, 11, 15)
 Gábor Csonka – violin (4, 11, 15)
 Gergely Kuklis – violin (4)
 András Sturcz – cello (4, 11, 15)
 Viktor Uhrin – violin (4, 11, 15)

Other credits
 Claus Altvater – executive producer, photography
 Róbert Balázs – engineer
 Paul Blakemore – mastering
 Francesco Cabras – photography
 Gary Casson – business consultant
 Martin Cooke – assistant engineer
 Susie Doherty – production coordination
 Frank Filipetti – engineer
 Roy Henderson  – engineer
 Rick Kwan – assistant engineer
 Katsuhiko Naito – engineer, mixing
 Michael Page – art direction, design
 Dave Poler – assistant engineer
 Spyros Poulos – engineer
 Hernan Romero – associate producer
 Viktor Scheer – assistant engineer
 Viktor Szabó – assistant engineer
 Csaba Tóth – engineer, photography

Chart performance

References

2011 albums
Al Di Meola albums
Concord Records albums